In Abhorrence Dementia is the second studio album by the Norwegian symphonic black metal band Limbonic Art released in 1997 through Nocturnal Art Productions.

Track listing

Personnel

Band members
Daemon – lead vocals, guitars
Morfeus – keyboards, lead guitars, drum programming, vocals

Guests
Morgana – additional vocals
Lisbeth Fagerheim – additional vocals

Technical staff
Peter Lundell – producer, mixing
Vargnatt Inc. – mastering
Grim Lindberg – video for photos
Morfeus – artwork

External links
In Abhorrence Dementia at Allmusic

1997 albums
Limbonic Art albums